Penstemon murrayanus is a species of flowering plant in the plantain family known by the common name scarlet beardtongue. It is endemic to Texas, Louisiana, Oklahoma, and Arkansas in the United States. The specific name murrayanuss honors Johann Andreas Murray, a Swedish botanist, and the common name "scarlet beardtongue" references the plant's scarlet flowers.

References

murraynus
Flora of Arkansas
Plants described in 1836